IATF 16949:2016 is a technical specification aimed at the development of a quality management system which provides for continual improvement, emphasizing defect prevention and the reduction of variation and waste in the automotive industry supply chain and assembly process. It is based on the ISO 9001 standard and the first edition was published in June 1999 as ISO/TS 16949:1999. IATF 16949:2016 replaced ISO/TS 16949 in October 2016.

The standard was prepared by the International Automotive Task Force (IATF) and the "Technical Committee" of ISO. It harmonises the country-specific regulations of quality management systems.

About 30 percent of the more than 100 existing motorcar manufacturers follow the requirements of the norm but especially the large Asian manufacturers have differentiated and have their own requirements for the quality management systems of their corporate group and their suppliers.

ISO/TS 16949 applies to the design/development, production and, when relevant, installation and servicing of automotive-related products.

The requirements are intended to be applied throughout the supply chain. For the first time vehicle assembly plants will be encouraged to seek ISO/TS 16949 [certification].

Historical background 
Many suppliers (OEMs) were asked by the car manufacturers to build and certify their quality management system according to the rules and regulations of their own country organizations, such as:
 VDA (Germany)
 AIAG (North America)
 AVSQ (Italy)
 FIEV (France)
 SMMT (UK)

But due to this regulation a supplier needed to provide two different certificates for Daimler and Chrysler (VDA 6.1 for Germany and QS 9000 America), even though the supplier delivered only to a single company. These complexities accelerated the need for harmonization.

Contents of the specification 
The aim of the standard is to improve the system and process quality to increase customer satisfaction, to identify problems and risks in the production process and supply chain, to eliminate their causes and to examine and take corrective and preventive measures for their effectiveness. The focus is not on the discovery, but on the avoidance of errors.

The eight main chapters of the standards are:
 Chapters 1-3: Introduction and Preface
 Chapter 4: Quality Management System (general requirements, control of documents and records)

4.1 General 
4.2 Documentation Requirements
4.2.1 General
4.2.2 Quality Manual
4.2.3 Control of documents  
4.2.3.1 Engineering Specification 
4.2.4 Control of records  
4.2.4.1 Records retention 
  
 Chapter 5: Responsibility of the management
 Chapter 6: Management of resources
 Chapter 7: Product realization
 Chapter 8: Measurement, Analysis and Improvement

The process-oriented approach to business processes that is addressed in the ISO 9001:2008 is the base of the standard. It looks at the business processes in a process environment in which there are interactions and interfaces that need to be recognized, mapped and controlled by the quality management system. Additionally the gateways to the exterior (to sub-suppliers, customers and to remote locations) are defined. The Standard distinguishes between customer-oriented processes, supporting processes and management processes. This process-oriented approach is intended to improve the overview of the whole process. This is not an isolated process, but a combination of all interacting business processes which affect the quality performance of a firm.

A key requirement of ISO/TS 16949:2009 is the fulfillment of customer-specific requirements, set up by the automotive manufacturer in addition to the quality management system of their suppliers. This may have decisively contributed to the worldwide recognition of the TS by many manufacturers.

Certification 
The ISO/TS 16949 can be applied throughout the supply chain in the automotive industry. Certification takes place on the basis of the certification rules issued by the International Automotive Task Force (IATF). The certificate is valid for three years and must be confirmed annually (as a minimum) by an IATF certified auditor (3rd Party Auditor) of an IATF recognized certification body. Re-certification is required at the expiry of the three-year period. Certification pursuant to ISO/TS 16949 is intended to build up or enforce the confidence of a (potential) customer towards the system and process quality of a (potential) supplier. Today, a supplier without a valid certificate has little chance of supplying a Tier 1 supplier and certainly no chance of supplying a car manufacturer with standard parts, if indeed that OEM is a participating member of the IATF (most Japan OEM are members of JAMA and not members of the IATF) .

Certification bodies include:
 ENCONA (Germany)
 ENCONA (United States)
 ENCONA (Taiwan)
 ENCONA (South Africa)   
 TÜV Rheinland (Germany)
 BSI Group (UK)
 Bureau Veritas (France)
 DNV GL (Norway)
 DQS (Germany)
 EAGLE Certification Group (USA)
IFCE (NORTHERN IRELAND)
 SAI Global (Australia)
 SGS S.A. (Switzerland)
 TÜV NORD (Germany)
 TÜV SÜD (Germany)
 United Registrar of Systems (UK)

References

External links 
 ISO/TS 16949:2009 Quality management systems—Particular requirements for the application of ISO 9001:2008 for automotive production and relevant service part organizations

16949
Automotive industry
Quality control
Automotive standards